Diana Elizabeth Santana Tavárez (born 17 October 1994) is a Dominican footballer who plays as a midfielder. She has been a member of the Dominican Republic women's national team.

International career
Santana represented the Dominican Republic at the 2010 CONCACAF Women's U-17 Championship qualifying stage and the 2012 CONCACAF Women's U-20 Championship qualifying. At senior level, she capped during the 2010 CONCACAF Women's World Cup Qualifying qualification, the 2012 CONCACAF Women's Olympic Qualifying Tournament (and its qualifying) and the 2014 Central American and Caribbean Games.

References 

1994 births
Living people
Dominican Republic women's footballers
Women's association football midfielders
Dominican Republic women's international footballers
Competitors at the 2014 Central American and Caribbean Games